TV Sonce is a local television station in North Macedonia. it was founded in 1999.

Line up
 Sunlight (Macedonian: Сончевина)
 Macedonia Mother of the earth (Macedonian: Македонија Мајка на земјата)
 News (Macedonian: Вести)

References

Television channels in North Macedonia
Mass media in Skopje